Noranda railway station is a proposed railway and bus station for the Transperth network. Construction started in 2021, and it  as a station on the Morley–Ellenbrook railway line, serving the Perth suburbs of Beechboro, Kiara and Noranda. It is being built in the median of Tonkin Highway, just north of Benara Road.

History
In August 2019, the location of the station was revealed. In November 2019, Metronet did a community survey to decide where to put the station car park. The three options were south-west, north-west or north-east of Benara Road and Tonkin Highway. In the end, the north-east option was the most preferred option, with 66% of respondents preferring that option. The reasons included that it does not require a signalised intersection unlike the other options, and it had the largest amount of car bays of the three options.

In September 2020, Laing O'Rourke was announced as the preferred proponent for the construction of the Morley–Ellenbrook railway line.

Station design
Noranda railway station will be built just north of Benara Road in the Tonkin Highway median, similar to many stations along the Joondalup and Mandurah railway lines. Passengers will access the station by either a walkway to the Benara Road bridge or a walkway across Tonkin Highway to the carpark. The carpark will be located east of Tonkin Highway and be accessed via Benara Road. It will have 400 car bays and a drop off zone. Two bus stands will be located on Benara Road. A pedestrian underpass will be built under Benara Road to allow pedestrians to safely and easily access the station and bus stop. Facilities at the station will include passenger toilets and a kiosk.

Services
Noranda station will be served by Transperth Trains operating along the Morley–Ellenbrook railway line to Perth and Ellenbrook railway stations. It is projected that a journey to Perth will take 18 minutes. Noranda station is in fare zone 2. Noranda station is projected to have 1,810 passenger boardings per day in 2031.

References

External links
 Morley–Ellenbrook railway line on the Metronet website.

Morley–Ellenbrook line
Proposed railway stations in Perth, Western Australia
Noranda, Western Australia
Transperth railway stations in highway medians